Jagratha: CBI Diary - Part 2 is a 1989 Indian Malayalam-language investigative thriller film directed by K. Madhu, starring Mammootty,  Mukesh and Jagathy Sreekumar.

It is the second movie in the CBI investigative thrillers series serving as a sequel to Oru CBI Diary Kurippu released in 1988. Mammootty reprises his role as the CBI officer Sethurama Iyer. Three more sequels were produced in the CBI series: Sethurama Iyer CBI (2004), Nerariyan CBI (2005) and CBI 5: The Brain (2022). Jagratha was a commercial success and is considered one of the best investigative thrillers in Malayalam.

Plot

A famous actress, Aswathi, is found hanging in a hotel room and is declared dead. DYSP Devadas who is the appointed police investigation officer, investigates the case and confirms the cause of death was suicide. Due to public pressure, the Kerala government is forced to transfer the case to CBI. CBI official Sethurama Iyer is pressured by his superior to complete the investigation with a short deadline, thus he investigates the case with the help of his two juniors Vikram and Chacko.

During the course of investigation, CBI Sethu discovers that Aswathi, just 5 feet 4 inches tall, could not have reached the height of the ceiling hook to hang herself, even with the assistance of the tallest furniture. Also, the grease stains on the saree used to commit suicide gave the indication that the culprit had used it to pull the body up through the ceiling hook. Therefore, CBI consequently confirms that it was a murder made to look like a suicide. This leads to apprehending the main suspects.

Firstly, Viswam, a popular actor who was defamed after Aswathi detailed his extramarital affairs in a popular Malayalam magazine. Viswam had hired a local goon named Babu to murder Aswathi.

Secondly, Ex-Minister Bhargavan who had molested Ashwathi in the past becomes another suspect. Thirdly, Mohan, boyfriend and fiancée of Aswathi also becomes a suspect as he could not provide an alibi for the night of the murder.

Lastly, the local goon Babu hired by Viswam is apprehended and during interrogation reveals that Aswathi was already dead by apparent suicide when he broke into her room. This statement further detours the investigation and also becomes a primary turning point in the story. In parallel it is learnt that an anonymous phone call made at night to the hotel where Aswathi stayed on the night of the murder seems to be another red herring in the story.

Upon further investigation, it is learnt that the saree used to hang Aswathi was a brand new piece and was purchased from a nearby KSRTC station. The shop owner remembers the person who purchased the saree and also a phone call from a public telephone box at the railway station was used to call both Aswathi's hotel and also to Janardhanan Nair's home (who is the father of Mohan). Connecting these two together, CBI Sethu arrests Mohan. Upon the arrest, Mohan's father Janardhanan Nair, who is a lawyer by profession, challenges that he will disprove the case against Mohan as there is no solid evidence against him. CBI Sethu says he has enough evidence against Mohan to charge him with murder. Firstly, only a person who is close to Aswathi could have gained her trust as she didn't put up any fight against the perpetrator. Secondly, there was enough evidence that only someone who was as tall as 6 feet could easily use a tall furniture available in the room to hook the saree. Thirdly, Mohan did not have a solid alibi for that night.

This provoked Janardhanan Nair to confess by accident that Mohan could never have committed the crime as he was not there at the scene. This confession led the CBI to force Janardhanan Nair to reveal how he knows that Mohan wasn't there that night and subsequently explain how and why he murdered Aswathi, and also to reveal who his aide was in the murder. He reveals that the aide was his junior lawyer who was 6 feet tall.

In a separate scene, it is revealed Janardhanan Nair had an affair with one of his clients, Rukmini, who gave birth to Aswathi. Since Janardhanan Nair was already married, his relationship with Rukmini was kept a secret. Janardhanan opposed the marriage of Aswathi to his son Producer Mohan since they both were half-siblings. Janardhanan did not have the courage to inform Mohan about his half-sister Aswathi, fearing the social consequences. After his attempts to convince Mohan and Aswathi to separate proved futile, Janardhanan and his aide junior lawyer murdered Aswathi.

In the climax scene, Janardhanan and his associate are arrested by the police.

Cast

Release
The film was released on 7 September 1989.

Box office
The film was commercial success.

References

External links
 

1980s Malayalam-language films
1989 films
Films scored by Shyam (composer)
Indian sequel films
CBIDiary2
Central Bureau of Investigation in fiction
Films directed by K. Madhu